Svishtov Municipality is a municipality (obshtina) in Veliko Tarnovo Province, Central-North Bulgaria, located in the Danubian Plain along the right bank of Danube river. It is named after its administrative centre - the town of Svishtov.

Settlements 

Svishtov Municipality includes the following 16 places (towns are shown in bold):

Demography 
The following table shows the change of the population during the last four decades.

Religion
According to the latest Bulgarian census of 2011, the religious composition, among those who answered the optional question on religious identification, was the following:

See also
Provinces of Bulgaria
Municipalities of Bulgaria
List of cities and towns in Bulgaria

References

External links
 Official website 

Municipalities in Veliko Tarnovo Province